2018 census may refer to:

2018 Colombian Census
2018 Alberta municipal censuses
2018 Census of Malawi
2018 New Zealand census